Bezgureh (also Romanized as Bizgūreh; also known as Bozvareh) is a village in Quri Qaleh Rural District, Shahu District, Ravansar County, Kermanshah Province, Iran. At the 2006 census, its population was 224, in 49 families.

References 

Populated places in Ravansar County